Atlas in the Land of the Cyclops (Italian: Maciste nella terra dei ciclopi) is a 1961 Italian Gothic horror film starring Gordon Mitchell and Chelo Alonso.

Plot
Queen Capys is doomed to a life of slavery by the Powers of Darkness until the last descendant of Ulysses is put to death to please the Cyclops. This is almost accomplished in a raid on a village by the Queen's soldiers where a descendant of Ulysses is killed and his wife enslaved; however, their infant son is taken away to be protected by Maciste.

Cast
Gordon Mitchell as  Maciste    
Chelo Alonso as  Queen Capys    
Vira Silenti as  Queen Penope    
Dante DiPaolo as  Ifito    
Aldo Bufi Landi as  Sirone    
Giotto Tempestini as  Aronio    
Raffaella Carrà as  Eber   
Paul Wynter as  Mumba    
Massimo Righi as  Efros    
Aldo Pedinotti  as Cyclops

Release
Atlas Against the Cyclops was released in Italy on March 29, 1961 with a 90-minute running time. It was released in the United States on April 14, 1963 with a 100-minute running time.

Reception
It has been objected that in spite of the original title there is no "Atlas" to be found in either the Italian nor the English dubbed film version.

References

Footnotes

Sources

External links
 
 

1961 films
1960s fantasy films
Italian fantasy films
Peplum films
Maciste films
1961 drama films
Sword and sandal
Sword and sandal films
1960s Italian films